D810 may refer to:
 Nikon D810, a full-frame digital single-lens reflex camera
 Dell Latitude D810, a laptop computer